Damla Çakıroğlu (born June 22, 1994) is a Turkish female volleyball player. She played for TVF Fine Arts and Sports High School in Ankara. She wears number 1.

Damla is the daughter of Melih Çakıroğlu, former coach of the Türk Telekom Basketball Club.

Clubs
 TVF Güzel Sanatlar ve Spor Lisesi (Turkish Volleyball Federation Fine Arts and Sport High School), Ankara.
In the 2011-12 season, she transferred to İBA TED Ankara Kolejliler, which plays in the Turkish Women's Volleyball League.

Awards

Individual
 2011 FIVB Girls Youth World Championship - Most Valuable Player
 2011 FIVB Girls Youth World Championship - Best server
 2012 Women's Junior European Volleyball Championship - Most Valuable Player

National team
2011 European Youth Summer Olympic Festival - 
2011 FIVB Girls Youth World Championship - 
2012 Women's Junior European Volleyball Championship - 
 2015 Women's European Volleyball League –

See also
 Turkish women in sports

References

External links
 

1994 births
Living people
Turkish women's volleyball players
Place of birth missing (living people)